Victor Bonafède (26 October 1894 – 27 February 1965) was a Monegasque sports shooter. He competed at the 1924 Summer Olympics and 1936 Summer Olympics.

References

External links
 

1894 births
1965 deaths
Monegasque male sport shooters
Olympic shooters of Monaco
Shooters at the 1924 Summer Olympics
Shooters at the 1936 Summer Olympics
Place of birth missing